William Leavitt may refer to:

 William Leavitt (musician) (1926–1990), American jazz guitarist and arranger
 William Leavitt (artist) (born 1941), conceptual artist
 William Homer Leavitt (1871–?), American portrait painter